Consumer council may refer to:

 Consumer Council (Hong Kong)
 Consumers Council of Canada
 Consumer Council of Fiji
 Norwegian Consumer Council